Strike! may refer to:
 Strike! (1998 film)
 Strike! (musical), a 2005 musical play
 Strike! (album), a 2009 album by The Baseballs